Jansen Harkins (born May 23, 1997) is an American-born Canadian professional ice hockey center currently playing for the  Winnipeg Jets of the National Hockey League (NHL). Harkins was selected by the Jets in the 2nd round, 47th overall, in the 2015 NHL Entry Draft.

Playing career
Harkins was selected second overall by the Prince George Cougars in the 2012 WHL Bantam Draft and played with the Cougars since the 2012–13 WHL season. In 2013–14, Harkins skated in 67 games for Prince George in his first WHL season, and was a team captain for Canada Pacific in the 2014 World Hockey Challenge. He scored 10 goals with 24 assists, and was –9 with 18 penalty minutes for the Cougars.

During the 2014–15 WHL season, Harkins led Prince George in scoring in his second WHL season and played for the Canada U18 team in the 2013 Ivan Hlinka Memorial Tournament, and 2015 IIHF World U18 Championships tournaments. He scored 20 goals with 59 assists and was +7 with 45 penalty minutes, in 70 regular season games for the Cougars. He was rewarded for his outstanding play, when he was selected to skate in the 2015 CHL/NHL Top Prospects Game. Harkins was rewarded with the Dan Hamhuis Award, which is presented to the Most Valuable Player on the Prince George Cougars.

International play

Harkins helped Team Canada capture the gold medal at the 2014 Ivan Hlinka Memorial Tournament, and he went on to play again for Canada at the 2015 IIHF World U18 Championships, winning a bronze medal.

Personal life
His father is former NHL player Todd Harkins. Harkins was born in Cleveland, Ohio, but grew up in North Vancouver, British Columbia.

Career statistics

Regular season and playoffs

International

Awards and honors

References

External links

1997 births
American men's ice hockey centers
Canadian ice hockey centres
Ice hockey people from Cleveland
Jacksonville Icemen players
Living people
Manitoba Moose players
Prince George Cougars players
Winnipeg Jets draft picks
Winnipeg Jets players